The African goshawk (Accipiter tachiro) is an African species of bird of prey in the genus Accipiter which is the type genus of the family Accipitridae.

Description
The African goshawk is a medium to large-sized Accipiter which is mainly grey and rufous with the typical broad-winged and long-tailed shape of its genus. The adult has grey upperparts which tend to be darker in males than in females, the underparts are whitish marked with rufous barring which is more pronounced in males. The underwing is pale rufous, fading to white on some birds and the flight feathers and tail vary from sooty brown to grey with faint grey bars above, white with grey bars below. The bill is black, the cere is greenish-grey, the eyes are yellow, and the legs and feet are yellow. Juveniles are brown above with whitish unterparts and flanks which are boldly blotched with brown. Females weigh , while the smaller males weigh .

Voice
It is noisy when displaying. Its characteristic clicking call is omitted every 2–3 seconds and sounds to the human ear like two stones being knocked together.

Distribution
From the Western Cape of South Africa north to the southern Democratic Republic of Congo and through east Africa, Somalia to southern Ethiopia, including the islands of Mafia, Unguja (Zanzibar) and Pemba.

Habitat
The African goshawk generally occurs in forest and diverse dense woodland in both lowland and montane areas, but it can also be found in riverine and gallery forest, plantations of exotic trees, parks and large gardens. It can occur in both moist and dry forest, even in isolated patches.

Habits
The African goshawk typically soars above the canopy in the morning in a display flight involving slow wing beats interspersed with gliding, sometimes so high up that the only sign of the birds is its regular clicking call.  Its main prey are birds up to the size of hornbills or francolins, but it also feeds on mammals, lizards and sometimes invertebrates.  It is an ambush hunter, waiting on a perch until the prey is observed then swooping down to catch it.  Pairs occasionally hunt co-operatively at large congregations of prey, such as bat roosts or weaver colonies.

The African goshawk is territorial and the typical courtship display is performed by both sexes when they fly together in an undulated flight while calling loudly, sometimes finishing with a steep dive. The female builds the nest making a platform of sticks lined with fresh foliage, as well as pine needles, lichen and mistletoe. It is normally built on a branch away from the main trunk of a tree, as the species prefers to nest within dense foliage but the nest may also be constructed on top of an old Hadeda ibis nest. African Goshawks have also been recorded taking over the nest of a little sparrowhawk (Accipiter minullus) instead of building their own. One to three eggs are laid in July–December, with a peak in September–November and are incubated mainly or solely by the female for about 35–37 days, while the male regularly brings food to her. The chicks are fed by both parents, fledging at about 30–35 days old but staying within the vicinity of the nest tree for another six weeks or so before becoming fully independent roughly 1–3 months after leaving the nest.

The species has been recorded as being preyed on by the black sparrowhawk (Accipiter melanoleuca), the tawny eagle (Aquila rapax), the Cape eagle-owl (Bubo capensis), the lanner falcon (Falco biarmicus) and the peregrine falcon (Falco peregrinus).

Taxonomy
There are three currently recognised subspecies:

Accipiter tachiro tachiro: Southern Angola to Mozambique and South Africa
Accipiter tachiro sparsimfasciatus: Somalia to northern Democratic Republic of the Congo, Angola, Zambia and Mozambique
Accipiter tachiro pembaensis: Pemba

The African Goshawk is sometimes considered conspecific with the Central African subspecies of the Red-chested goshawk (Accipiter toussenelii).

References

External links

 African Goshawk - Species text in The Atlas of Southern African Birds

African goshawk
African goshawk
Birds of prey of Sub-Saharan Africa
African goshawk
Taxonomy articles created by Polbot